Jonathan Kongbo III (born March 19, 1996) is an American football outside linebacker for the National Football League (NFL). He was drafted by the Blue Bombers in the first round with the fifth overall pick in the 2019 CFL Draft. He played college football at Arizona Western and Tennessee.

College career
He was a three-sport athlete while attending Holy Cross Regional High School in Surrey, British Columbia, after transferring in grade 12 from Kitsilano Secondary. He accepted a scholarship to the University of Wyoming, where he was a redshirt in 2014 and did not play for the team. Kongbo then transferred to Arizona Western College, where he was a junior college All-American in 2015 and a high-profile college prospect. The following season in 2016, he played college football for Tennessee as a sophomore. His junior year was his best year, with ten games played and 29 total tackles. In 2018, his senior year, he moved into the linebacker role; after six games, he tore his anterior cruciate ligament (ACL) at The University of Tennessee against Auburn and did not play for the rest of the season.

Professional career

Winnipeg Blue Bombers
Upon entering the CFL Draft, Kongbo was at one point ranked the number-one prospect by the Central CFL Scouting Bureau and was eventually drafted fifth overall in the 2019 CFL Draft by the Winnipeg Blue Bombers. He was signed by the Blue Bombers on May 17, 2019, and placed on their six-game injured list, hoping to play before the end of summer. He played in his first career professional game on August 1, 2019, against the Toronto Argonauts. In his first season, Kongbo played in 12 games, recording 12 tackles and a sack. He played in all three of the Blue Bombers' post-season games, including the 107th Grey Cup game where he won his first Grey Cup championship. Kongbo was released on December 5, 2019, as part of a pre-determined agreement to pursue National Football League opportunities.

San Francisco 49ers
On January 1, 2020, Kongbo signed a reserve/future contract with the San Francisco 49ers of the NFL. He was waived/injured on August 27, 2020, and subsequently reverted to the team's injured reserve list the next day. He was waived with an injury settlement on September 4, 2020.

Winnipeg Blue Bombers
On June 7, 2021, it was announced that Kongbo had re-signed with the Winnipeg Blue Bombers to a one-year contract. Kongbo recorded 16 tackles on defense and one more on special teams, plus 3 sacks during the shortened 14 game regular season. Kongbo also had three more tackles and another sack in the playoffs, during which the Bombers won another Grey Cup. Kongbo was released to pursue NFL opportunities after the season concluded.

Denver Broncos
On January 12, 2022, Kongbo signed a reserve/future contract with the Denver Broncos of the NFL. He was waived on August 30, 2022, and signed to the practice squad the next day. He was promoted to the active roster on October 6. He was waived on October 11 and re-signed to the practice squad. He was promoted back to the active roster on December 31.

Personal life
Kongbo was born in Zaire (now known as the Democratic Republic of the Congo) to parents Joachim and Lily and has one brother, Joel. He moved to Canada when he was five years old.

References

External links

Denver Broncos bio
Winnipeg Blue Bombers bio
Tennessee Volunteers bio

Living people
1996 births
Players of Canadian football from British Columbia
Democratic Republic of the Congo emigrants to Canada
Democratic Republic of the Congo players of American football
Democratic Republic of the Congo players of Canadian football
Canadian football defensive linemen
American football defensive linemen
Arizona Western Matadors football players
Tennessee Volunteers football players
Winnipeg Blue Bombers players
San Francisco 49ers players
Denver Broncos players